The Boise State Broncos women's basketball team represents Boise State University in Boise, Idaho, United States. The school's team currently competes in the Mountain West Conference. They play their home games at ExtraMile Arena.

History
The Broncos played in the Northwest Women's Basketball League from 1977–1982, the Mountain West Athletic Conference from 1982 to 1988, the Big Sky Conference from 1988 to 1995, the Big West Conference from 1996 to 2001, the Western Athletic Conference from 2001 to 2010, before joining the Mountain West Conference in 2011.

Postseason results

NCAA Division I

AIAW Division I
The Broncos made one appearance in the AIAW National Division I basketball tournament, with a combined record of 0–2.

References

External links